Wheelchair fencing at the 2020 Summer Paralympics was held at the Makuhari Messe, the same place where goalball, sitting volleyball and taekwondo took place. It consisted of sixteen events (eight male, eight female) including two team events.

The 2020 Summer Olympic and Paralympic Games were postponed to 2021 due to the COVID-19 pandemic. They kept the 2020 name and were held from 24 August to 5 September 2021.

Participating nations

 (Host nation)

Medal table

Medalists

Men's events

Women's events

See also
Fencing at the 2020 Summer Olympics

References

External links
Results book 

2020 Summer Paralympics events
2020
 
Paralympics
International fencing competitions hosted by Japan